During World War II, the United States Army Air Forces (USAAF) established numerous airfields in Alabama for antisubmarine defense in the Gulf of Mexico and for training pilots and aircrews of AAF fighters and bombers.

Most of these airfields were under the command of Third Air Force or the Army Air Forces Training Command (AAFTC) (a predecessor of the current-day United States Air Force Air Education and Training Command). However, the other USAAF support commands (Air Technical Service Command (ATSC); Air Transport Command (ATC) or Troop Carrier Command) commanded a significant number of airfields in a support roles.

It is still possible to find remnants of these wartime airfields. Many were converted into municipal airports, some were returned to agriculture and several were retained as United States Air Force installations and were front-line bases during the Cold War. Hundreds of the temporary buildings that were used survive today, and are being used for other purposes.

Major Airfields

Third Air Force
 Detachment, 39th Base Headquarters and Air Base Squadron
 Auxiliary of Key Field, Mississippi
 Now: Demopolis Municipal Airport 

 Support of The Chemical Warfare Service, Camp Sibert
 Now: Northeast Alabama Regional Airport

AAF Training Command
AAF Eastern Flying Training Command

 Army Air Forces Basic Flying School/Army Air Forces Pilot School (Basic)/Army Air Forces Pilot School (Special, 4-Engine), 14 December 1942-30 June 1945
 446th Base Headquarters and Air Base Squadron 19 December 1942-30 April 1944
 2115th Army Air Force Base Unit 1 May 1944-1 November 1945
 Known sub-bases and auxiliaries
 Danville Auxiliary Field
 Trinity Auxiliary Field
 Bay Auxiliary Field
 Leighton Auxiliary Field
 Muscle Shoals Auxiliary Field
 Now: Courtland Airport 

 Air Corps Advanced Flying School (Single Engine)/Army Air Forces Advanced Flying School (Single Engine)/Army Air Forces Pilot School (Advanced, Single Engine) 16 December 1940-15 December 1945
 57th Air Base Squadron/57th Base Headquarters and Air Base Squadron 16 December 1940-30 April 1944
 2138th Army Air Force Base Unit (Pilot School, Advanced, Single Engine) 1 May 1944-15 December 1945
 Free French Air Force pilot training
 Known sub-bases and auxiliaries
 Anniston Army Air Field
 Selma Auxiliary Field (Selfield)
 Furniss Auxiliary Field
 Henderson Auxiliary Field 
 Mollette Auxiliary Field
 Autaugaville Auxiliary Field
 Later: Craig Air Force Base (1947-1977)
 Now: Craig Field Airport 

 Air Corps Basic Flying School/Army Air Forces Basic Flying School/ Army Air Forces Pilot School (Basic), 8 August 1940-10 September 1945
 58th Air Base Squadron/58th Base Headquarters and Air Base Squadron, 3 October 1940-30 April 1944
 2131st Army Air Forces Base Unit (Pilot School, Basic) 1 May 1944-13 December 1945
 Known sub-bases and auxiliaries
 McLemore Auxiliary Field
 Elmore Auxiliary Field
 Mount Meigs Auxiliary Field
 Taylor Field
 Dannelly Auxiliary Field
 Now:  Montgomery Air National Guard Base and Montgomery Regional Airport
 Deatsville Auxiliary Field
 Now:  Gunter Annex (Non-flying USAF facility)

 Air Corps Tactical School, 15 July 1931-13 May 1942
 Hq, Southeast Air Corps Training Center/Hq, Southeast Army Air Forces Training Center/Hq, Army Air Forces Eastern Flying Training Command, 1 September 1940-1 June 1946
 Air Corps Replacement Center (Pilot)/Air Corps Replacement Training Center (Aircrew)/Army Air Forces Pre-flight School (Pilot), 21 February 1941-1 December 1944
 14th Air Base Squadron/14th Base Headquarters and Air Base Squadron, 1 September 1940-30 April 1944
 2132nd Army Air Forces Base Unit, 1 May 1944-15 December 1945
 Headquarters, Air University
 Known sub-bases and auxiliaries
 Passmore Auxiliary Field
 Troy Auxiliary Field
 Autaugaville Auxiliary Field
 Now:   Maxwell Air Force Base 

 Air Corps Advanced Flying School (Single Engine)/Army Air Forces Advanced Flying School (Single Engine)/Army Air Forces Pilot School (Advanced, Single Engine), 30 November 1941-19 October 1945
 73d Air Base Squadron/73rd Base Headquarters and Air Base Squadron, 30 November 1941-30 April 1944
 2116th Army Air Forces Base Unit (Pilot School, Advanced, Single Engine), 1 May 1944-January 1946
 Known sub-bases and auxiliaries
 Ozark Army Air Field
 Now:  Cairns Army Airfield 
 Wiksburg Auxiliary Field
 Dothan Auxiliary Field
 Headland Auxiliary Field
 Goldberg Auxiliary Field
 Hyman Auxiliary Field
 Now: Dothan Regional Airport 

 Army Air Forces Flying School (Basic-Advanced)/Army Air Forces Pilot School (Basic-Advanced), July 1942-14 April 1946
 Base Detachment/318th Air Base Squadron/318 Base Headquarters and Air Base Squadron, 10 November 1941-30 April 1944
 2143rd Army Air Forces Base Unit (Pilot School, Basic-Advanced), 1 May 1944-14 April 1946
 Known sub-bases and auxiliaries
 Griel Auxiliary Field
 Shorter Auxiliary Field
 Note: See Moton Field for Tuskegee Airmen National Historic Site
 Now: Sharpe Field

Contract Flying Schools

 Contract Pilot School, Glider, 6 July 1942-15 February 1943
 533rd Base Headquarters and Air Base Squadron, 25 May 1943-1 April 1944
 4120th Army Air Forces Base Unit, 1 April 1944-2 April 1945
 Under Contract to: Waterman Airlines
 Known sub-bases and auxiliaries
 St Elmo Auxiliary Field
 Later: Sub-Base of Brookley Field (ATC)
 Now: Mobile Regional Airport  and 
 Coast Guard Aviation Training Center Mobile

 Operated by 65th AAF Flying Training Detachment (Primary)
 Under Contract to: Southern Airways
 Known sub-bases and auxiliaries
 Harris Station Auxiliary Field
 Anderson Auxiliary Field
 Beaver Dam Auxiliary Field
 Poole Auxiliary Field
 Tanner Auxiliary Field
 Now: Pryor Field Regional Airport 

 Contract Glider Training
 Later: Auxiliary of Birmingham Army Air Field (ATC)
 Now: Industrial site 

 Operated by 51st AAF Flying Training Detachment (Primary)
 Under Contract to:  Alabama Institute of Aeronautics
 Known sub-bases and auxiliaries
 Albright Auxiliary Field
 Foster Auxiliary Field
 Knauer Auxiliary Field
 Moody Auxiliary Field
 Rice Auxiliary Field
 Now: Tuscaloosa Regional Airport 

 Operated by 66th AAF Flying Training Detachment (Primary)
 Under contract to Tuskegee Institute
 Known sub-bases and Auxiliaries
 Calabee Flight Strip
 Hardaway Auxiliary Field
 Kennedy Auxiliary Field
 Now: Tuskegee Airmen National Historic Site
 Now: Moton Field Municipal Airport

Air Technical Service Command

 310th Base Headquarters and Air Base Squadron, 27 May 1942-17 April 1944
 4139th Army Air Force Base Unit, 1 May 1945-unknown date
 Joint USAAF/Civil Use
 Also used by Third Air Force and Air Transport Command
 Now:  Birmingham Air National Guard Base 

 Mobile Air Depot Control Area/Mobile Air Service Command/Mobile Air Technical Service Command/Mobile Air Materiel Area, 1 February 1943-30 June 1968
 480th Base Headquarters and Air Base Squadron, 1 January 1943-1 April 1944
 4119th Army Air Force Base Unit/4119th Air Force Base Unit, 1 April 1944-28 August 1948
 Also used by Air Transport Command
 Was: Brookley Air Force Base (1948-1969)
 Now: Mobile Downtown Airport

Minor Airfields

 US Army Support
 Now: Abandoned

 US Army Support
 Now:  Redstone Army Airfield 

 Undetermined USAAF Use
 Now: Chilton County Airport 

 Undetermined USAAF Use

 Undetermined USAAF Use

References

 Maurer, Maurer (1983). Air Force Combat Units Of World War II. Maxwell AFB, Alabama: Office of Air Force History. .
 Ravenstein, Charles A. (1984). Air Force Combat Wings Lineage and Honors Histories 1947-1977. Maxwell AFB, Alabama: Office of Air Force History. .
 Thole, Lou (1999), Forgotten Fields of America : World War II Bases and Training, Then and Now - Vol. 2.  Pictorial Histories Pub . 
 Military Airfields in World War II - Alabama

External links

 01
World War II Army Airfields
World War II Army Airfields
World War II Army Airfields
United States World War II army airfields
Airfields of the United States Army Air Forces in the United States by state